Novobogoroditskoye is a rural locality (a selo) and the administrative center of Novobogoroditskoye Rural Settlement, Petropavlovsky District, Voronezh Oblast, Russia. The population was 731 as of 2010. There are 17 streets.

Geography 
Novobogoroditskoye is located 11 km southeast of Petropavlovka (the district's administrative centre) by road. Aleksandrovka is the nearest rural locality.

References 

Rural localities in Petropavlovsky District, Voronezh Oblast